The atmosphere of Triton is the layer of gases surrounding Triton. The surface pressure is only 14 microbars (1.4 Pa or 0.0105mmHg),  of the surface pressure on Earth, and it is composed of nitrogen, similar to those of Titan and Earth. It extends 800 kilometers above its surface. Observations obtained in 1998 showed an increase in temperature.

Composition
Nitrogen is the main gas in Triton's atmosphere. The two other known components are methane and carbon monoxide, whose abundances are a few hundredths of a percent of that of the nitrogen. Carbon monoxide, which was discovered only in 2010 by the ground-based observations, is slightly more abundant than methane. The abundance of methane relative to nitrogen increased by four to five times since 1986 due to the seasonal warming observed on Triton, which passed its southern-hemisphere solstice in 2001.

Other possible components of the Triton's atmosphere include argon and neon. Because they were not detected in the ultraviolet part of the spectrum of Triton obtained by Voyager 2 in 1989, their abundances are unlikely to exceed a few percent. In addition to the gases mentioned above, the upper atmosphere contains significant amounts of both molecular and atomic hydrogen, which is produced by the photolysis of methane. This hydrogen quickly escapes into the space serving as a source of plasma in the magnetosphere of Neptune.

Other Solar System planets, dwarf planets, and moons with nitrogen-dominated atmospheres are the Earth, Titan, Pluto and, possibly, .

Structure
Triton's atmosphere is well structured and global. The atmosphere extends up to 800 kilometers above the surface, where the exobase is located, and had a surface pressure of about 14 microbars as of 1989. This is only 1/70,000th of the surface pressure on Earth. The surface temperature was at least  because Triton's nitrogen ice is in the warmer, hexagonal crystalline state, and the phase transition between hexagonal and cubic nitrogen ice occurs at that temperature. An upper limit in the low 40s (K) can be set from vapor pressure equilibrium with nitrogen gas in Triton's atmosphere. In the 1990s it probably increased by about 1 K, due to the general global warming as Triton approaches the southern-hemisphere summer (see below).

Convection near Triton's surface heated by the Sun creates a troposphere (a "weather region") rising to an altitude of about 8 km. In it temperature decreases with height reaching a minimum of about 36 K at the tropopause. There is no stratosphere, defined as a layer where heating from the warmer troposphere and thermosphere is balanced by radiative cooling. Higher regions include the thermosphere (8–850 km) and exosphere (above 850 km). In the thermosphere the temperature rises reaching a constant value of about 95 K above 300 km. The upper atmosphere continuously leaks into outer space due to the weak gravity of Triton. The loss rate is about 1 nitrogen molecules per second, which equals about 0.3 kg/s.

Weather

Nitrogen ice particles form clouds in the troposphere a few kilometers above the surface of Triton. Above them a haze is present extending up to 30 km from the surface. It is believed to be composed largely of hydrocarbons and nitriles created by the action of the Sun's and stellar ultraviolet light on methane.

In 1989 Voyager 2 discovered that near the surface there are winds blowing to the east or north-east with a speed of about 5–15 m/s. Their direction was determined by observations of dark streaks located over the southern polar cap, which generally extend from the south-west to north-east. These winds are thought to be related to the sublimation of nitrogen ice from the southern cap as there was summer in the southern hemisphere in 1989. The gaseous nitrogen moves northward and is deflected by the Coriolis force to the east forming an anticyclone near the surface. The tropospheric winds are capable of moving material of over a micrometer in size thus forming the streaks.

Eight kilometers high in the atmosphere near the tropopause, the winds change direction. They now flow to the west and are driven by differences in temperature between the poles and equator. These high winds may distort Triton's atmosphere making it asymmetric. An asymmetry was actually observed during star occultations by Triton in 1990s.

The atmosphere is dense enough to allow the formation of dunes.

Observations and Exploration

Before Voyager 2
Before Voyager 2 arrived, a nitrogen and methane atmosphere with a density as much as 30% that of Earth had been suggested. This proved to be a great overestimate, similar to the predictions of the atmospheric density of Mars, but like on Mars, a denser early atmosphere is postulated.

Voyager 2
Voyager 2 flew past Triton five hours after closest approach to Neptune in mid-late August 1989. During the flyby, Voyager 2 took measurements of the atmosphere, finding methane and nitrogen in the atmosphere. Voyager 2 also captured at least two plumes erupting through the Nitrogen ice of Triton and this is the first evidence of active plumes on an icy world such as Triton. The plumes were around 100 km long and 8 km above the surface and produced dark shadows in the images from voyager 2. Around 100 dark surface fans on the SPT are attributed to the plumes. The vapor mass flux of the plumes is estimated to be around 400 kg/s per plume. They caused large amounts of dark substrate to be thrown through the thin Nitrogen ice then into the atmosphere. The plumes captured on Triton are similar to the plumes seen on Enceladus and the modeled ejection speeds are more consistent to a deep source.

Later Observations
In the 1990s, observations from Earth were made of the occultation of stars by Triton's limb. These observations indicated the presence of a denser atmosphere than was inferred from Voyager 2 data. The surface pressure in the late 1990s is thought to have increased to at least 19 μbar or, possibly, even to 40 μbar.
Other observations have shown an increase in temperature by 5% from 1989 to 1998. One of the scientists involved in investigation of Triton, James L. Elliot, said:

"At least since 1989, Triton has been undergoing a period of global warming. Percentage-wise, it's a very large increase."

These observations indicate Triton is having a warm southern-hemisphere summer season, that only happens once every few hundred years, near solstices. Theories for this warming include the sublimation of frost on Triton's surface and a decrease in ice albedo, which would allow more heat to be absorbed. Another theory argues the changes in temperature are a result of deposition of dark, red material from geological processes on the moon. Because Triton's Bond albedo is among the highest within the Solar System, it is sensitive to small variations in spectral albedo.

Triton Watch
The Triton Watch program uses astronomers to monitor changes in the atmosphere. It was created from funds from NASA.

Future Exploration

Trident 
Trident is a proposed NASA mission that is to further study Neptune's moon Triton (moon).  The proposed launch of trident is set for October 2025 and will not arrive until 2038. Triton is a candidate ocean world of very high priority because of the glimpses of activity shown from the voyager 2 flyby. The origin of the activity seen from voyager is still unclear and this makes Triton very high on the list when it comes to investigating ocean planets.  Trident would dramatically help in furthering our knowledge of the atmosphere of Triton as well as the activity from the surface plumes captured in Voyager 2. It would also help gain knowledge on the surface level of the moon and shed light on the processes that go on there. This mission has three scientific goals it is trying to achieve, which are: if Triton has a subsurface ocean or if it has had an ocean in the past, to further understand what energy sources and sinks are at play with the resurfacing of Triton, and to investigate and study the organic constituents on Triton's surface. To find an ocean on Triton, magnetic induction techniques will be used. The presence of the saltiness of an ocean makes it conductive, which means it is detectable to magnetic induction techniques with a spacecraft in orbit. The salinity of the ocean is mostly acquired from differentiation from volatiles in rocks on the planet and it is thought that these volatiles are sodium chloride dominant.  If Triton is confirmed an ocean world, it would become the first example of an ocean world with its origin being from the Kuiper Belt. To help achieve these goals, Trident would be equipped with a plasma spectrometer, a high resolution infrared spectrometer with a spectral range up to 5μm, as well as many other instruments.

Neptune Odyssey Mission 
The Neptune Odyssey mission concept is a flagship-class orbiter equipped with atmospheric probes that is proposed to be sent into the Neptune-Triton system. This mission would launch around 2031 and would be aboard the SLS (Space Launch System) or an equivalent launch vehicle. The spacecraft would use a gravity assist from Jupiter and then would cruise for 13 years to its destination in the Neptune-Triton system for its study. This mission will be trying to answer questions of: How do interior and atmospheres of ice giant form and evolve, is Triton an ocean world and what is the cause of the plumes seen on voyager 2, and how the geophysics of Triton can help expand the knowledge of dwarf planets such as Pluto. Some measurements to be taken in this mission are: Magnetic Field, Gravitational Harmonics, Spectroscopy, visible imager, ions and electrons, neutral mass spectrometry, and dust.

See also
 Extraterrestrial atmospheres
 Triton
 Voyager 2

References

External links
 Voyager website

Triton
Triton
Triton (moon)